The 2011–12 season of Olympique de Marseille (OM) was the club's 62nd season in the Ligue 1. They participated in five competitions Ligue 1, UEFA Champions League, Coupe de France, Coupe de la Ligue and the Trophée des Champions, winning the last two.

Key Events 

21 May 2011: After months of speculation, Taye Taiwo joined Milan on a free transfer.
19 June 2011: Left-back Jérémy Morel joined OM from Lorient for a fee of €2.5 million.
29 June 2011: after the loss of Taye Taiwo, OM picked up Nicolas Nkoulou from Monaco for a reported €3.5 million.
4 July 2011: Defensive midfielder Alou Diarra joined for an undisclosed fee from Bordeaux. Diarra put pen to paper on a three-year deal.
21 July 2011: Argentine International left-back Gabriel Heinze left for Serie A club Roma. Roma picked up Heinze on a free transfer and signed him to a what is believed to be a one-year contract.
27 July 2011: In what turned out to be a nine-goal thriller, Marseille beat out competition Lille to win the 2011 Trophée des Champions 5–4. The game ended with two very late penalties converted by André Ayew. This is now the second year in a row that Marseille have won the Trophy.

Players

First team squad 
Updated 30 January 2012.

Squad statistics 
Appearances (subbed on), goals (own Goals)
yellow cards (double Yellow cards), red cards
Statistics accurate as of 8 August 2011

Transfers

In

Out

Loan In

Loan out

Competitions

Pre-season and friendlies
Last updated: 11 August 2011
Source: soccervista

Trophée des Champions 

Last updated:11 August 2011
Source:Scoresway

Ligue 1

League table

Results summary

Results by round

Matches
Last updated: 15 August 2011Source: Olympique de MarseilleNote: Ligue 1 fixtures not posted due to copyright

Coupe de France

Coupe de la Ligue

UEFA Champions League

Group stage

Knockout phase

Round of 16

Quarter-finals

Olympique de Marseille Reserves

Reserve squad

See also
OM.net

References

External links

Olympique de Marseille seasons
Marseille
Marseille